Shonte Peoples (born August 30, 1972) is a former linebacker in the Canadian Football League.

College career

Peoples played as strong safety for University of Michigan football team in fall of 1990 to 1993.

Professional career
Having played his college football at the University of Michigan, Peoples signed on with the Las Vegas Posse, a CFL expansion franchise, in 1994. Las Vagas Posse folded a year later. He moved on to another CFL American team, the Birmingham Barracudas, in 1995.

He was selected by the Green and white in the 1996 Dispersal Draft for the CFL (now defunct) American teams. He played 1997 and 1998 with the Blue and Gold, where he enjoyed his greatest success in 1997 as an all star and runner-up for the MODP Award. He played with the Stamps for 1999 and 2000, and for the Green Riders for 3 last seasons (2001 to 2003)

Off-field issue
In March 1994 he fired a pistol at police he had mistaken for car thieves trying to steal his new Jeep. Four months later, a jury found him guilty on two felony charges of assault with a dangerous weapon.

References

1972 births
Living people
Birmingham Barracudas players
Calgary Stampeders players
Canadian football linebackers
Las Vegas Posse players
Michigan Wolverines football players
Sportspeople from Saginaw, Michigan
Players of American football from Michigan
Saskatchewan Roughriders players
Winnipeg Blue Bombers players